Ladies' Man is an American sitcom starring Lawrence Pressman as a divorced male working at a women's magazine. The series premiered October 27, 1980, on CBS. The program also stars Louise Sorel and her former husband, Herbert Edelman. The show was written by Anne Convy and Carmen Finestra. The series did not do well in the ratings and was canceled after one season.

Synopsis
Divorced Alan Thackeray (Pressman) was a single father of daughter Amy (Natasha Ryan) and was completely surrounded by women.  At home, with good advice on how to raise Amy (and to provide her with a motherly figure in her life, in lieu of her real mother), was his cheerful and friendly next-door neighbor, Betty Brill (Karen Morrow).

At Women's Life magazine, the magazine he worked at as a feature writer, he was also surrounded by women.  The staff included fellow columnists: serious minded researcher Gretchen (Simone Griffeth); Susan (Allison Argo), a militant feminist; and romantic minded reporter Andrea Gibbons (Betty Kennedy); and all were supervised by the magazine's hard-to-please and somewhat dominating editor, Elaine Holstein (Sorel).  The only other male at Women's Life, aside from Alan, was the harried accountant, Reggie (Edelman).

Situations dealing with his homelife and work life, which was completely surrounded by women was the main premise of the series.

Cast
 Lawrence Pressman ... Alan Thackeray
 Natasha Ryan ... Amy Thackeray
 Karen Morrow ... Betty Brill
 Simone Griffeth ... Gretchen
 Allison Argo ... Susan
 Betty Kennedy ... Andrea Gibbons
 Herbert Edelman ... Reggie
 Louise Sorel ... Elaine Holstein

Episodes

References

External links

1980s American sitcoms
1980 American television series debuts
1981 American television series endings
CBS original programming
Television series by 20th Century Fox Television